Evidence: The Last Report is a 1996 adventure video game produced by Microïds

Plot 
You play as Channel Z reporter Daniel Singer, who has become the prime suspect in the murder of his recent ex-girlfriend. You only have a limited amount of time to solve the crime and clear your name.

Gameplay 
The game is mostly a point and click adventure game, with some action sequences in genres such as shoot-em-up and beat-em-up.

Release 
Prior to its release on DOS, PlayStation and Windows, the game was originally in development and announced for the Atari Jaguar CD as one of the first upcoming titles for the add-on in 1994. It was originally slated to be published around the third quarter of 1995, however, this early version was never released for unknown reasons. A version of the game for the Philips CD-i was also in development and even previewed on French magazine CD Consoles, with plans to be published in 1995, but it was never released as well.

References

External links 
 Evidence: The Last Report at GameFAQs
 Evidence: The Last Report at Giant Bomb
 Evidence: The Last Report at MobyGames

1996 video games
Adventure games
Cancelled Atari Jaguar games
Cancelled CD-i games
DOS games
Microïds games
PlayStation (console) games
Single-player video games
Point-and-click adventure games
Video games developed in France
Windows games